Jiří Veber (born 29 November 1968) is a Czech former ice hockey player. He competed in the men's tournament at the 1994 Winter Olympics.

Career statistics

Regular season and playoffs

International

References

External links
 

1968 births
Living people
Czechoslovak ice hockey defencemen
Olympic ice hockey players of the Czech Republic
Ice hockey players at the 1994 Winter Olympics
Ice hockey people from Prague
Rytíři Kladno players
VHK Vsetín players
Espoo Blues players
Ässät players
Tappara players
Schwenninger Wild Wings players
HC Plzeň players
Molot-Prikamye Perm players
HC Litvínov players
HC Berounští Medvědi players
Czech ice hockey defencemen
Czech expatriate ice hockey players in Finland
Czech expatriate ice hockey players in Germany
Czech expatriate ice hockey players in Russia